The 2008 IIHF World Championship rosters consisted of 399 players on 16 national ice hockey teams. In honour of the International Ice Hockey Federation's (IIHF) 100th anniversary, the World Championship was hosted in Canada for the first time. Held in Quebec City and Halifax, Canada, the 2008 IIHF World Championship was the 72nd edition of the tournament. Russia won the Championship, the second time they had done so and their 24th title if including those won by the Soviet Union. Dany Heatley of Canada led the tournament in scoring with 20 points, and was named the tournament's most valuable player and top forward. Canadian Brent Burns was named top defenceman, while Evgeni Nabokov of Russia was selected as top goaltender.

Before the start of the World Championship, each participating nation had to submit a list of players for its roster. A minimum of 15 skaters and two goaltenders, and a maximum of 20 skaters and three goaltenders had to be selected. If a country selected fewer than the maximum allowed, they had to choose the remaining players prior to the start of the tournament. After the start of the tournament, each team was allowed to select an additional two players, either skaters or goaltenders, to their roster, for a maximum roster of 25 players. Once a player was registered to the team, he could not be removed from the roster.

To qualify for a national team under IIHF rules, a player must follow several criteria. He must be a citizen of the nation, and be under the jurisdiction of that national ice hockey association. Players are allowed to switch which national team they play for, providing they fulfill the IIHF criteria. If participating for the first time in an IIHF event, the player would have had to play two consecutive years in the national competition of the new country, without playing in another nation. If the player has already played for a national team before, he may switch nationality if he is a citizen of the new country, and has played for four consecutive years in the national competition of the new country. This switch may only happen once in the player's life.



Legend

Belarus

Head coach:  Curt Fraser

Skaters

Goaltenders

Canada

Head coach:  Ken Hitchcock

Skaters

Goaltenders

Czech Republic

Head coach:  Alois Hadamczik

Skaters

Goaltenders

Denmark

Head coach:  Mike Sirant

Skaters

Goaltenders

Finland

Head coach:  Doug Shedden

Skaters

Goaltenders

France

Head coach:  Dave Henderson

Skaters

Goaltenders

Germany

Head coach:  Uwe Krupp

Skaters

Goaltenders

Italy

Head coach:  Fabio Polloni,  Michel Goulet

Skaters

Goaltenders

Latvia

Head coach:  Oļegs Znaroks

Skaters

Goaltenders

Norway

Head coach:  Roy Johansen

Skaters

Goaltenders

Russia

Head coach:  Vyacheslav Bykov

Skaters

Goaltenders

Slovakia

Head coach:  Július Šupler

Skaters

Goaltenders

Slovenia

Head coach:  Mats Waltin

Skaters

Goaltenders

Sweden

Head coach:  Bengt-Åke Gustafsson

Skaters

Goaltenders

Switzerland

Head coach:  Ralph Krueger

Skaters

Goaltenders

United States

Head coach:  John Tortorella

Skaters

Goaltenders

References

Team rosters
Belarus
Canada
Czech Republic
Denmark
Finland
France
Germany
Italy
Latvia
Norway
Russia
Slovakia
Slovenia
Sweden
Switzerland
United States

Player statistics
Belarus
Canada
Czech Republic
Denmark
Finland
France
Germany
Italy
Latvia
Norway
Russia
Slovakia
Slovenia
Sweden
Switzerland
United States

rosters
IIHF World Championship rosters